The Case of Swans (1592) Trinity Term, 34 Elizabeth I,  is a landmark decision in English property law.

Facts
Dame Joan Young (née Joan Wadham, sister and a co-heiress of her brother Nicholas Wadham) and Thomas Saunger received a writ from the Exchequer, directing the Sheriff of Dorset to round up 400 loose swans from the rivers of the county. Swans were Royal fowl, however, and a wild swan was considered the property of the monarch.

The right to these swans in Dorset had since time immemorial been held by the local abbot, who lost the right along with the abbey to Henry VIII at the dissolution of the Monasteries. Henry then granted the estate to Giles Strangways, Dame Joan's deceased first husband, whose heir gave them a right to the swans for one year. The new queen, Elizabeth I, now sought possession of the swans.

Judgment
The question was whether the swans were Strangways's to grant or remained the queen's. Sir Edward Coke, as solicitor general, represented the queen.

The Court held that the swans that are ferae naturae, or wild animals, cannot be given by transfer or taken by prescription.

See also
English property law

Notes

English property case law
1592 in law
1592 in England
1592 in English law
Edward Coke cases